Fingerpickin'  is an album by the American jazz guitarist Wes Montgomery.

Background 
Most of the album was recorded in Indianapolis on December 30, 1957. From that session, six songs were released as the album The Montgomery Brothers and Five Others in 1957. The album featured Indianapolis native Freddie Hubbard's recording debut. Three songs ("Stranger in Paradise", "Baubles, Bangles and Beads", and "Not Since Nineveh)" were recorded during a session in Los Angeles on April 22, 1958, and appeared on the album Kismet by The Mastersounds. Montgomery played solos only on these three songs. The Mastersounds was a group that included his brothers Buddy and Monk Montgomery. Wes Montgomery was invited to the session by Richard Bock, the album's producer at Pacific Jazz Records. His composition "Fingerpickin'" appeared on the album.

Reception 

In a AllMusic review, music critic Scott Yanow wrote: "This CD reissues the complete album (which usually has appeared in piecemeal fashion) and finds Wes already quite recognizable. The pretty standard hard bop music... Although this reissue on a whole is not essential, the music is generally enjoyable and the CD will fill some gaps in one's Wes Montgomery collection."

Track listing

Original release 
The Montgomery Brothers and Five Others
 Sound Carrier – 6:55
 Lois Ann – 4:44
 Bud's Beaux Arts – 7:32
 Bock to Bock – 10:08
 All the Things You Are – 3:58
 Billie's Bounce – 4:41

Personnel 
 Wes Montgomery – guitar
 Freddie Hubbard – trumpet - Tracks 1-4
 Waymon Atkinson – tenor saxophone - Tracks 1-4
 Alonzo Johnson – tenor saxophone - Tracks 1-4
 Buddy Montgomery – vibraphone - Tracks 1-6, 8-10
 Joe Bradley – piano - Tracks 1-5, 7
 Richard Crabtree – piano - Tracks 8-10
 Monk Montgomery – electric bass
 Paul Parker – drums - Tracks 1-7
 Benny Barth – drums - Tracks 8-10

References

1957 debut albums
Wes Montgomery albums
Pacific Jazz Records albums